Ramy Adeeb is the founder and CEO of social curation platform Snip.it and is a former venture capitalist investor in start-ups such as Square and Groupme.

Snip.it
Originally from Egypt, Adeeb founded Snip.it in spring 2011 while looking for a way to share relevant information regarding the Arab Spring uprisings. As of Sept. 2012, Snip.it had about 20,000 registered users who create content and 100,000 who browse it. Average time spent on the site as of Sept. 2012 was 12 minutes compared to 5.23 minutes spent on the average website.

On January 22, 2013, Yahoo! acquired Snip.it for US$10 million.

Early life and career
The son of engineers, Adeeb started writing software at 12. A year later, he built a database to manage a large Egyptian corporation's employee records. The database crashed when it surpassed tens of thousands of records, which Adeeb later said taught him an early lesson in the importance of building to scale.

In 1994 Adeeb was selected to represent Egypt on scholarship at Pearson College UWC, in British Columbia, Canada, where he completed the International Baccalaureate in 1996.

Adeeb holds bachelor's and master's degrees in Computer Science from Harvard University and an MBA from Stanford University, where he was an Arjay Miller Scholar. He is the co-founder of the Harvard Arab Alumni Association and the Stanford GSB Middle East and North Africa Club.

At Tellme Networks, Adeeb led the enterprise engineering group and oversaw development of more than 30 products.  Tellme Networks was sold to Microsoft in 2007 for $800 million. He remained at Microsoft for less than a year before going to Stanford for his MBA.

Adeeb was a principal at venture capital firm Khosla Ventures, where he worked with noted investors Vinod Khosla and Pierre Lamond on such investments as Square, Groupme (acquired by Skype), and Ness Technologies. He has served on the boards of such companies as Ness Technologies and Storify.

References

Living people
Stanford Graduate School of Business alumni
Harvard School of Engineering and Applied Sciences alumni
Egyptian emigrants to the United States
Egyptian computer scientists
American technology chief executives
Egyptian venture capitalists
Businesspeople from the San Francisco Bay Area
Egyptian company founders
Year of birth missing (living people)
People educated at a United World College